In anatomy, the term nasal meatus can refer to any of the three meatuses (passages) through the skulls nasal cavity: the superior meatus (meatus nasi superior), middle meatus (meatus nasi medius), and inferior meatus (meatus nasi inferior).

The nasal meatuses are located beneath each of the corresponding nasal conchae. In the case where a fourth, supreme nasal concha is present, there is a fourth supreme nasal meatus.

Structure

The superior meatus is the smallest of the three. It is a narrow cavity located obliquely below the superior concha. This meatus is short, lies above and extends from the middle part of the middle concha below. From behind, the sphenopalatine foramen opens into the cavity of the superior meatus and the meatus communicates with the posterior ethmoidal cells. Above and at the back of the superior concha is the sphenoethmoidal recess which the sphenoidal sinus opens into. The superior meatus occupies the middle third of the nasal cavity’s lateral wall.

The middle meatus is the middle-sized and located nasal opening, lying underneath the middle concha and above the inferior concha where the meatus extends along its length. On it is a curved fissure, the hiatus semilunaris, limited below by the edge of the uncinate process of the ethmoid and above by an elevation named the bulla ethmoidalis; the middle ethmoidal cells are contained within this bulla and open on or near to it.

Through the hiatus semilunaris the meatus communicates with a curved passage termed the infundibulum, which communicates in front with the anterior ethmoidal cells and in rather more than fifty percent of skulls is continued upward as the frontonasal duct into the frontal air-sinus; when this continuity fails, the frontonasal duct opens directly into the anterior part of the meatus.

Below the bulla ethmoidalis and hidden by the uncinate process of the ethmoid is the opening of the maxillary sinus (ostium maxillare); an accessory opening is frequently present above the posterior part of the inferior nasal concha.

The inferior meatus is the largest of the three. It lies below the inferior concha and above the nasal cavity. It extends most of the length of the nasal cavity’s lateral wall. It is broader in the front than at the back, and presents anteriorly the lower orifice of the nasolacrimal canal.

References

External links
 
  — Coronal section

Nose